Fritz Walter (1920–2002) was a German football player and 1954 World Cup-winning captain.

Fritz Walter may also refer to:
Fritz-Walter-Stadion, a stadium in Kaiserslautern named after the above
Fritz Walter (footballer, born 1960), German player, played in 1980s and 1990s   
Fritz Walter (politician) (1896–1977), German politician of the FDP
Fritz Walter (football executive) (1900–1981), chairman of VfB Stuttgart
Friedrich Walter (1924–1980), Australia ice hockey player